The Islamabad Bar Council is a statutory & deliberative assembly of lawyers in Islamabad Capital Territory for safeguarding the rights, interests and privileges of practicing lawyers, within Islamabad Capital Territory of Pakistan. The Council also regulates the conduct of lawyers and helps in the administration of justice. It has been constituted in 2014 after addition of Section 3(1)(iii) into the Legal Practitioners and Bar Councils Act, 1973 and became functional on 23 May 2015 after its first election. All advocates practicing in any court or tribunal in Islamabad, except the Supreme Court are licensed and regulated by the Council. Advocates licensed and regulated by other provincial bar councils can also practice in Islamabad.

Composition
The Islamabad Bar Council consists of Vice Chairman and Chairman Executive Committee, both elected by members of Islamabad Bar Council each year. Members of Islamabad Bar Council are elected by the advocates from different constituencies across the Islamabad Capital Territory.  Members serve a term of five years, beginning on January 1, with elections held each November to fill seats of those whose terms will expire in the following January. The Council became functional after its first election was held on 2 May 2015 after its formation in 2014.
The Advocate General of the Islamabad Capital Territory, acts as ex officio Chairman of the Islamabad Bar Council. Advocate General does not exercise the powers which other elected members of the Council can with in.

Electoral Officers
 Vice Chairman: Vice Chairman is figurehead of Bar Council and is Elected by the members of the Council in January each year. Vice Chairman is ex officio Member of each Committee of Bar Council. Traditionally, the office of vice chairman is considered to be the foremost elected position in the council but however, the executive powers of Bar Council are rest with Chairman Executive Committee. The incumbent Vice Chairman Islamabad Bar Council for the year 2021 is Zulfiqar Ali Abbasi ASC. 
 Chairman Executive: The Chairman of the Executive Committee is generally the most powerful office of Bar Council and is elected by the members of the Council in each year. Chairman Executive Committee has full authority to decide matters of Bar Council in every aspect. The incumbent Chairman Executive committee for the year 2021 is Qazi Adil Aziz ASC. 
 Members of Islamabad Bar Council are Elected after 4 years for a duration of 5 years by Elected Representatives of Lawyers of in Provincial Bar Councils.

Permanent Officer
 Secretary: A full-time employee of Grade 21 or 22, responsible to perform duties listed under the Legal Practitioners and Bar Councils Act, 1973. The powers of the Secretary are subject to the provisions of the Legal Practitioners and Bar Council Act and the Rules the secretary acts, under the supervisory control of the Executive Committee.

See also
 Islamabad District Court
 List of Pakistani Lawyers
 Pakistan Bar Council
 Punjab Bar Council
 Sindh Bar Council
 Khyber Pakhtunkhwa Bar Council
 Balochistan Bar Council

References

External links
 

Bar Councils in Pakistan
Pakistani lawyers
Professional associations based in Pakistan
Organizations established in 2014
2014 establishments
2014 establishments in Pakistan